In logic, especially as applied in mathematics, concept  is a special case or specialization of concept  precisely if every instance of  is also an instance of  but not vice versa, or equivalently, if  is a generalization of . A limiting case is a type of special case which is arrived at by taking some aspect of the concept to the extreme of what is permitted in the general case. A degenerate case is a special case which is in some way qualitatively different from almost all of the cases allowed.

Special case examples include the following:
 All squares are rectangles (but not all rectangles are squares); therefore the square is a special case of the rectangle.  

See also 

 Specialization (logic)

Mathematical logic